Wilnelia, Lady Forsyth-Johnson (née Merced; born 12 October 1957) is a Puerto Rican former actress, model and beauty queen. She won Miss World 1975, and was married to entertainer Sir Bruce Forsyth from 1983 until his death in August 2017.

Career

Born in Caguas, Puerto Rico, she won Miss Mundo de Puerto Rico 1975 and went on to win Miss World 1975 at the Royal Albert Hall in London. She remained the only Puerto Rican to win the title until Stephanie Del Valle won Miss World 2016 after serving as a judge for the pageant. She travelled widely during 1975 and was invited to El Salvador by the Salvadorean military government before the civil war. Wilnelia fell in love with England, a place she would later call home.

After passing on her crown in 1976, she was signed by Ford Models in New York City. In 1978, a giant poster of Wilnelia Merced was displayed in Times Square. She was introduced to British television entertainer Bruce Forsyth at the 1980 Miss World competition gala in London. While still a public figure at home in Puerto Rico, she retired from modelling after her marriage to Forsyth in 1983.

Personal life
Merced married Bruce Forsyth in New York in 1983. The couple's son, Jonathan Joseph ("JJ"), was born in 1987. She remained married to Forsyth until his death in August 2017. She now lives with her son near the Wentworth Estate in Surrey, England.

On 29 January 2018, for the first time ever, Merced spoke openly about the final days she spent with her husband before his death. She expressed her appreciation of being able to be with him at the last moment. She felt "lucky" that all the close family members managed to say goodbye at his deathbed. Merced recalled that Forsyth was surrounded by all his daughters, who kept him accompanied and watched films together. Merced said that Forsyth had wished to celebrate his hundredth birthday at the London Palladium.

See also

List of Puerto Ricans
History of women in Puerto Rico

References

External links

 Further information about 1975 contest

1957 births
Living people
Miss Puerto Rico winners
Miss World 1975 delegates
Miss World winners
People from Caguas, Puerto Rico
People from Virginia Water
Puerto Rican beauty pageant winners
Puerto Rican emigrants to England
Puerto Rican female models
Wives of knights